Jiangsu Normal University is a provincial key university located in Xuzhou, Jiangsu province, China. It was jointly constructed by the Chinese Ministry of Education and the Government of Jiangsu Province.

History 
The university was established in 1952 as the Jiangsu Wuxi Business Cadre School in Southern Jiangsu's Wuxi. In 1956, the Chinese Ministry of Education granted permission for the school to become a higher education institution. Its name was changed to Jiangsu Normal Academy. In August 1958, the Jiangsu Normal Academy relocated to Xuzhou city in North Jiangsu. In March 1959, Xuzhou Normal Academy was merged with Jiangsu Normal Academy and became the Xuzhou Normal College, and became the only undergraduate college in North Jinagsu. In early 1960s, due to Zhou Enlai's suggestion that there should be a college in vast north Jiangsu, it avoided the fate of disappearing in the layout of higher education system. 
During the Culture Revolution, once it changed its name to Huaihai College by Red Guard, and stopped recruiting students for six years. In 1979, it began to recruit postgraduates, and it became one of the first batch of universities than could confer master's degree in China in 1981. 
In 1989, the Second Xuzhou Normal Academy (founded in 1984) was merged into Xuzhou Normal College. In 1996, Chinese Ministry of Education approved the college to upgrade to university. It was renamed as Xuzhou Normal University. In 1999, the State Coal Bureau's Xuzhou Industrial College merged into Xuzhou Normal University. This allowed the university to become a comprehensive university with specializations in engineering and sciences.

Xuzhou Normal University was renamed as Jiangsu Normal University in 2011.

Main Campuses

Jiangsu Normal University is made up of four campuses currently.
Quanshan Campus, is the primary and biggest campus, and was built from 1985.
Yunlong Campus, which is the oldest, built in 1950s.
Jiawang Campus, which is located in the exurbanof Xuzhou City. It was the campus of Xuzhou Industrial College.
Kuiyuan Campus, which used to be the campus of the Second Xuzhou Normal Academy.
The four campuses cover around 122 thousands square meters with nearly one million square meters of building space.

Teaching Staff
There are 1358 full-time teachers, including 218 professors, 445 assistant professors, and 313 doctors. Moreover, there are 2 academicians of Chinese Academy of Sciences, 1 committee member of the Chinese Academy of Social Sciences.

Schools and Departments
School of Linguistic Sciences 
Neurolinguistics; fMRI and ERPs for Language Sciences; Theoretical linguistics; Engineering Linguistics; Teaching Chinese to Speakers of Other Languages; China Minority Linguistics; Chinese Language
School of Literature 
Chinese Language and Literature(non-normal); Chinese Language and Literature(high-level secretarial); Chinese Language
College of Foreign Languages 
English(normal, commercial, translate); Japanese; Russian; Spanish; International Marketing
School of Educational Science 
Elementary Education; Psychological Education; Preprimary Education; Applied Psychology
Institute of Mathematical Sciences 
Mathematics and Applied Mathematics; Information and Computing Science; Statistics
Physical Culture Institute 
Physical Education; Science of Ethnic Traditional Sports; Athletic Training
Academy of Fine Arts 
Fine Arts; Fine Arts(normal); Artistic Designing Program; Drawing
School of Economics 
Economics; International Commerce; International Economy and Trade
College of Life Science 
Biological Science; Biotechnology; Gardening and Zoological Science
College of Information and Communication
Advertising Program; Radio and Television Journalism; Radio and TV Editing
History and Culture and Tourism Institute
History; Tourist Management; Culture Industry Management
School of law and Politics
Law; International Trade Laws; Ideological and Political Education; Politics and Administration; Social Work
Physical and Electronic Engineering Institute
Physics, Electronics Science and Technology; Electronic Information Engineering and Optical Information Science and Technology
College of Chemistry and Chemical Engineering 
Applied Chemistry; Chemistry; Pharmaceutical Engineering and Environmental Engineering
College of Landscape and Animal Science
School of City and Environmental Science
School of City and Environmental Science Geosciences; Urban and Rural Planning &Resource management; Geographic Information System; Environmental Science
Faculty of Management
Marketing Management; Financial Management; Administrative; Logistics Management; Public Enterprise Management
School of Geodesy and Geomatics
Surveying and Mapping Engineering; Land Resource Management;Remote Sensing Technology
The College of Mechanical Engineering 
Mechanical Engineering; Machinery Electronics; CNC Technology; 
Electrical Engineering and Automation Institute
Academy of Music

References

External links
Jiangsu Normal University
Introduction about JSNU to International students
School of Linguistic Sciences, Jiangsu Normal University

Teachers colleges in China
Universities and colleges in Jiangsu